Allegra Versace Beck (born 30 June 1986), commonly known as  Allegra Versace, is an Italian-American heiress and socialite. Since 2011 Allegra has been a director of Gianni Versace S.p.A. and has worked in New York City as a theatrical dresser.

Early life and education 

Allegra Versace is the daughter of Italian fashion designer Donatella Versace and American ex-fashion model Paul Beck, and the niece of  fashion designer Gianni Versace. She was raised outside Milan, Italy, with her younger brother Daniel. Sir Elton John gave her a piano that she admits she never learned to play. As a child, she took ballet classes for nine years and is to this day a huge admirer of ballet. She credits her uncle Gianni as having instilled in her this lifelong passion for ballet. For one of her birthdays, he introduced her to Maurice Béjart.

Versace attended The British School of Milan, then known as "The Sir James Henderson School", where she was tightly guarded. Following the completion of secondary education, she went abroad, first to Brown University in Rhode Island, then in 2006, she enrolled at UCLA, where she studied French, art history, and theatre.

Inheritance of Versace
Allegra Versace was eleven years old when her uncle Gianni Versace was fatally shot outside his Miami mansion in July 1997. Her mother immediately sought counseling for her. On her 18th birthday, she received 50% ownership of Gianni Versace S.p.A. Allegra's uncle Santo Versace already owned 30% of the fashion empire, and her mother already owned 20%, but due to a long-standing disagreement between the two, the remaining 50% of the Versace empire was bequeathed by Gianni to Allegra. Allegra instantly became worth hundreds of millions of dollars. Despite legally being able to claim full control of her inheritance at the age of 18, she opted to focus entirely on her studies and did not begin real participation in the business of Versace until she was 24.

Personal life
She has struggled with anorexia nervosa.

References

External links 
 

1986 births
Brown University alumni
Fashion designers from Milan
Italian women fashion designers
Italian people of American descent
Italian socialites
21st-century Italian businesswomen
21st-century Italian businesspeople
Living people
University of California, Los Angeles alumni
Versace